The Class 422 is a series of four-car electric multiple units that are a derivative of the DBAG Class 423. The two inner cars in the set are designated as Class 432 vehicles.

History 
The units were commissioned by Deutsche Bahn in 2005. 78 units worth €343 million were built by Bombardier Transportation and Alstom and delivered between March 2008 and October 2010. They are now used in such places as like on the Rhine-Ruhr S-Bahn which operate in cities like Köln and Düsseldorf as well as the Ruhr area.

Deutsche Bahn uses the units on the Rhine-Ruhr S-Bahn network, unlike most S-Bahn Networks which use similar DBAG Class 423 trains. The inner carriages are called Class 432. Following a timetable change in December of 2019 the units are currently used exclusively on the S1, S4, S5 (occasionally) and S6 lines of the network.

Electric multiple units of Germany
15 kV AC multiple units
Bombardier Transportation multiple units
Alstom multiple units